The second generation Moto E (marketed as the New Moto E) is an Android smartphone developed by Motorola Mobility. Released on February 25, 2015, it is a successor to the Moto E released in 2014. The New Moto E is a low-end device for first-time smartphone owners or budget-minded consumers, and is available in 40 countries worldwide.

Hardware
The second generation Moto E has a 4.5-inch 540p LCD screen, 1.2 GHz quad core processor,  1GB RAM, storage of 8GB (5.47 GB is user accessible) with microSD card slot (supports expandable storage of up to 32GB). It also has a water-resistant coating which protects it from light water splash; however, the phone itself is not water resistant. It is available in either 3G or 4G LTE. The 3G version has a Snapdragon 200 SoC while the 4G LTE version runs a Snapdragon 410 SoC.

The rear camera is a 5 MP shooter, but does not have an LED flash; it also has a VGA front-facing camera. It has a 2390 mAh Li-ion battery which is not user replaceable. It does not have an LED notification light as it uses Motorola's Moto Display technology, and it's the first budget phone to include this. It also features a Corning Gorilla Glass 3 display, making it scratch resistant but not shatter resistant. It does not feature a removable back cover; the SIM and Micro SD card slots are located under a removable plastic outer band - the "Motorola Band", which Motorola calls "accent bands".  These are available directly from Motorola in packs of three; aside from the stock black and white, there are six other colors to choose from.

Software
The smartphone was originally launched with Android 5.0.2 "Lollipop", but was updated to 5.1.1 "Lollipop". The 4G variant of the Moto E was updated to 6.0 "Marshmallow" in February 2016, in limited countries/regions only.

Motorola had promised that it would push future Android version updates to the Moto E, but the phone was not included in the initial list to be updated to Android 6.0 "Marshmallow". Motorola later announced that the LTE version of Moto E would receive the update in Canada, Latin America, Europe and Asia (except China).

Generation comparison 

All three generations use micro-SIMs and use micro-USB B power connectors.

Models
There are two models of the 2nd generation Moto E:

3G - Otus - with a Snapdragon 200
 XT1505 - Global models
 XT1506 - Global, Dual SIM
 XT1511 - US model

4G/LTE - Surnia - with a Snapdragon 410
 XT1514 - Brazil, Dual SIM
 XT1521 - Global, Dual SIM
 XT1523 - Brazil, Dual Sim, 16 GB
 XT1524 - Global models
 XT1526 - 4G/LTE (CDMA) for Sprint (Sprint Prepaid, Boost, Virgin Mobile), US
 XT1527 - USA model
 XT1528 - 4G/LTE (CDMA) for Verizon Prepaid, US
 XT1529 - 4G/LTE (CDMA) for LTE in Rural America (LRA) Partners

Official accessories
To customize the phone, Motorola released the new Moto E in either black or white bezel. Motorola released replaceable color bands (yellow, turquoise, blue, raspberry, purple and red) in addition to larger "Grip Shell" cases.

Press release
In February 2015, Motorola shipped promo boxes to various members of the press, to arrive on the 25th. Inside the box was a mock-press conference to announce the phone. Inside the box contained a miniature stage, press pass, a Moto E and replaceable color band.

On 18 August 2015, Lenovo announced that it had begun manufacturing Motorola smartphones at a plant in Sriperumbudur near Chennai, India run by Singapore-based contract manufacturer Flextronics International Ltd. The first smartphone manufactured at the facility was the 4G variant of the Moto E (2nd generation).

Reception
Ars Technica liked that the phone is well-built, the screen is decent, it has near-stock Android, the phone has decent performance and has excellent battery life. They did not like the camera, the limited storage, lack of NFC for mobile payments and that the $119 model (the 3G only) doesn't have some of the $149 model's best capabilities.

References

External links 
 

Android (operating system) devices
Motorola smartphones
Mobile phones introduced in 2015
Motorola products